Spline may refer to:

Mathematics
 Spline (mathematics), a mathematical function used for interpolation or smoothing
  Smoothing spline, a method of smoothing using a spline function

Devices
 Spline (mechanical), a mating feature for rotating elements
 Flat spline, a device to draw curves
 Spline drive, a type of screw drive
 Spline cord, a type of thin rubber cord used to secure a window screen to its frame
 Spline (or star filler), a type of plastic cable filler for CAT cable

Other
 Spline (alien beings), in Stephen Baxter's Xeelee Sequence novels

See also